The Baby Whisperer is a fifteen-part Discovery Home and Health TV series presented by Tracy Hogg (The Baby Whisperer).

Episode guide
 Baby Ella - Tracy Hogg helps a baby and her parents break the association between food and sleep.
 Baby James - Tracy Hogg is called in to help baby James sleep for longer when his parents complain that he keeps them awake all night.
 Caitlin Hall - Fifteen-month-old Caitlin will not eat solids, so Tracy Hogg suggests how to wean her off milk.
 Dexter Powell - Dexter Powell is 19 months old and has trouble controlling his temper to the point that he hurts himself.
 Elizabeth Wilkinson - A woman worries about not producing enough milk to breastfeed her newborn.
 Hamish Frost - Baby whisperer Tracy Hogg visits a mother who is finding it difficult to care for her premature baby.
 Harvey and Olly Spence - Baby Olly will not stop crying after he is fed, and the baby whisperer tries to figure out the problem.
 Jane's Holly - Baby James will not sleep at night and his parents need help from Tracy, the baby whisperer.
 Leanne O'Condell - A mother-to-be is worried at the thought of breastfeeding, so Tracy Hogg tries to reassure her by offering guidelines.
 Mackenzie Hartwell - An infant cannot stay asleep, so his parents call in a baby whisperer to help them get a good night's rest.
 Max Brown - A toddler is rough with his baby brother, so Tracy Hogg helps him and his mother adjust to life with the new arrival.
 Primrose Lennon - Baby Primrose will not take a bottle and her mother is reaching the end of her tether, prompting a visit from Tracy Hogg.
 Sophia Calkins - Baby Sophia refuses to be weaned off breast-feeding, so Tracy Hogg comes up with a solution to encourage her to eat solids.
 Tia Ratnavira - An infant will not stop crying unless she is held by her mother, so her parents call in an expert to solve the problem.
 Xavier Blore - Baby Xavier's parents hide anxiously in the kitchen to avoid waking him, until Tracy Hogg arrives to offer suggestions on how their child should be treated.

External links
 

Discovery Channel original programming